O Vincent Esposito (October 12, 1914 – April 15, 1981) was an American lawyer and businessman.

Born in New Haven, Connecticut, Esposito moved with his family to Hawaii Territory when he was young. Esposito received his bachelor's degree from University of Hawaii in 1937 and his law degree from Harvard Law School in 1941. He practiced law in Hawaii. Esposito served in the United States Military during World War II as an agent in counterespionage. He was the chief prosecutor for the War Crime Commission and was an attorney with the Allied Supreme Allies of the Pacific. Esposito was also the deputy attorney for Honolulu Hawaii City and County. From 1950 to 1958, Esposito served in the Hawaii Territorial House of Representatives and was the territorial house speaker. Esposito was a Democrat. From 1960 until 1966, Esposito served in the Hawaii State Senate.

Notes

1914 births
1981 deaths
Businesspeople from New Haven, Connecticut
People from Honolulu
University of Hawaiʻi at Mānoa alumni
Harvard Law School alumni
Hawaii lawyers
Members of the Hawaii Territorial Legislature
20th-century American politicians
Democratic Party Hawaii state senators
Lawyers from New Haven, Connecticut
20th-century American businesspeople
20th-century American lawyers